Imta was a ruler of Sumer.

IMTA may refer to:

Groups, Organizations, Companies
International Modeling and Talent Association
International Map Trade Association
International Management Teachers Academy, of the Central and East European Management Development Association
International Military Testing Association, for military science

Institute of Municipal Treasurers and Accountants, former name of the Chartered Institute of Public Finance and Accountancy
Instituto Mexicano de Tecnología del Agua, see Water supply and sanitation in Mexico and Irrigation in Mexico
Institute for Medical Technology Assessment (iMTA) of Erasmus University Rotterdam

Other uses
Integrated multi-trophic aquaculture
 Intel Modular Test Architecture, a type of Fox toolkit
It's That Man Again, a British radio comedy
imta, a term in Moroccan Arabic

See also